Qeshlaq Aghdash-e Beyglar (also Romanized as Qeshlāq-e Āghdāsh-e Beyglar) is a village in Qeshlaq-e Sharqi Rural District, Qeshlaq Dasht District, Bileh Savar County, Ardabil Province, Iran. At the 2006 census, its population was 48, in 10 families.

References 

Towns and villages in Bileh Savar County